Jim Tolbert (born March 12, 1944) is a former professional American football player who played defensive back for eleven years in the American Football League and in the NFL from 1966 through 1976. Before his professional career, Tolbert played for Lincoln University of Missouri.

See also
List of Tennessee Titans players
Other American Football League players

References

1944 births
Living people
People from Fairfield, Alabama
American football cornerbacks
San Diego Chargers players
Houston Oilers players
St. Louis Cardinals (football) players
Lincoln Blue Tigers football players
American Football League players